Cochylimorpha alternana is a moth from the family Tortricidae. It is found from France and Great Britain east to the Ural Mountains and Asia Minor. It is also present in North Africa (Libya) and Iran.

The wingspan is 20–24 mm. There are two generations per year with adults on wing in May and June and again in August.

The larvae feed on the flower buds and developing florets of Centaurea scabiosa.

References 

Aarvik, L., Berggren, K. og Hansen, L.O. (2000) Catalogus Lepidopterorum Norvegiae. Lepidopterologisk Arbeidsgruppe/Norsk Institutt for Skogforskning. 
Website Svenska Fjärilar, with image gallery: 
Cochylimorpha alternana on UK moths: 

Cochylimorpha
Moths described in 1834
Tortricidae of Europe
Moths of Asia
Moths of Africa